Four ships of the French navy have borne the name Terpsichore, after Terpsichore, one of the Muses of Greek mythology:

Ships named Terpsichore 
Sold in 1766. 
 , a 36-gun frigate 
 , a 40-gun frigate 
 , a 60-gun frigate

See also

Notes and references
Notes

References

Bibliography
 

French Navy ship names